Expando is the fifth studio album released by American musician Timothy B. Schmit. The album was released on October 20, 2009 on Lost Highway Records. It is Schmit's first studio album since 2001's Feed the Fire.

Schmit wrote all the songs himself and recorded them in his home studio.

Track listing
 "One More Mile" – 4:18
 featuring Keb' Mo'
 "Parachute" – 6:18
 featuring Graham Nash and Kenny Wayne Shepherd
 "Friday Night" – 4:43
 featuring Van Dyke Parks
 "Ella Jean" – 4:05
 "White Boy from Sacramento" – 4:55
 "Compassion" – 4:40
 "Downtime" – 6:33
 featuring Dwight Yoakam, Kid Rock, and Gary Burton
 "Melancholy" – 3:27
 "I Don't Mind" – 4:13
 featuring Van Dyke Parks
 "Secular Praise" – 4:52
 featuring The Blind Boys of Alabama
 "A Good Day" – 4:47
 featuring Greg Leisz

Personnel

Musicians
 Timothy B. Schmit – vocals, bass, acoustic guitar (1-4, 6-11), ukulele (1, 9), percussion (1, 3, 4, 6, 9), tambourine (2, 5, 8), strumstick (2), backing vocals (2, 3, 11), tenor guitar (3, 11), mandolin (3), drums (3), dobro (4), harmonica (4, 11), electric rhythm guitar (5), slide dobro (5), baritone guitar (7), electric piano (8)
 Benmont Tench – organ (2, 10), electric piano (5)
 Van Dyke Parks – accordion (3, 7, 9, 10)
 Garth Hudson – organ (3)
 Keb' Mo' – slide dobro (1)
 Kenny Wayne Shepherd – lead guitar (2)
 Hank Linderman – baritone guitar (3), backing vocals (3, 11), finger snaps (7)
 Ben Schmit – lead guitar (5), drums (5)
 Greg Leisz – steel guitar (11)
 Jim Keltner – drums (2, 7, 8, 10, 11), percussion (7, 10)
 Gary Ponder – trash can (3)
 Gary Burton – vibraphone (7)
 David Ralicke – alto saxophone (9), tenor saxophone (9), trombone (9)
 Freebo – tuba (9)
 Graham Nash – backing vocals (2)
 Marlena Jeter – backing vocals (5)
 Mortonette Jenkins – backing vocals (5)
 Valerie Pinkston – backing vocals (5)
 Dwight Yoakam – backing vocals (7)
 Kid Rock – backing vocals (7)
 The Blind Boys of Alabama – backing vocals (10)
 Donna De Lory – backing vocals (11)

Production
 Timothy B. Schmit – producer, mixing, inside booklet photography
 Hank Linderman – production assistance, engineer, mixing, back cover artwork 
 Joe Gastwirt – mastering 
 Jean Schmit – front cover artwork, back cover artwork 
 Gary Burden – art direction, design 
 Jenice Heo – art direction, design 
 Randee St. Nicholas – booklet back photography 
 Paul Goldsmith – inside jacket photography

Charts

References

2009 albums
Timothy B. Schmit albums
Lost Highway Records albums